Frédéric Botton (5 August 1936 – 27 June 2008) was a French lyricist and composer.

Songs (in alphabetical order) 
He has written many songs, in particular for:

 Barbara : "Il me revient"
 Mireille Darc : "Compartiment 23" (1968), "Où est mon zèbre ?" (1968)
 France Gall : "Gare à toi Gargantua" (1967)
 Juliette Gréco : "Les Pingouins" (1970), "Zanzibar" (1970), "Toi… je veux" (1970), "Petite correspondance" (1970), "Doux oiseaux de la jeunesse" (lyrics by Françoise Sagan, 1971), "Tout près de vous my love" (adaptation by Frédéric Botton from canticle "Plus près de toi mon Dieu", music by Lowell Mason, 1971)
 Betty Mars : "Comé-comédie" (for the Eurovision Song Contest 1972)
 Régine : "La Grande Zoa" (1966), "Raconte-moi dandy" (1967), "De toutes les manières".
 Alice Sapritch : "Les hommes sont des poupées" (1975), "Milady" (1975)
 Ann Sorel : "L'Amour à plusieurs" (1972)

Filmography 
He composed numerous film scores, notably:
 1971 : Popsy Pop, directed by Jean Herman
 1980 : Les Phallocrates, directed by Claude Pierson
 1988 : L'Excès contraire, directed by Yves-André Hubert (TV)
 1993 : Un crime, directed by Jacques Deray
 2002 : Une femme de ménage, directed by Claude Berri
 2005 : L'un reste, l'autre part, directed by Claude Berri
 2006 : Camping, directed by Fabien Onteniente
 2007 : Ensemble, c'est tout, de Claude Berri
 2010 : Camping 2, directed by Fabien Onteniente

Television 
 Composer of the very jazzy theme music for the show Ce soir ou jamais presented by Frédéric Taddéi on France 3.

External links 
 

1936 births
2008 deaths
French film score composers
French male film score composers
French lyricists
20th-century French musicians
20th-century French male musicians